Laura Ràfols Parellada (born 23 June 1990) is a Spanish former footballer who played as a goalkeeper. She served as the captain for Barcelona, and also represented the club in the UEFA Women's Champions League.

Career

Club
Ràfols started playing football for Atlètic Vilafranca's boys team at the age of five, since at the time there was no female exclusive team for her age range. After three years she joined their girls team and remained a member of the club until joining Barcelona at the age of 14. After a temporary relegation to the second division during 2007–08, Barcelona achieved many trophies with Ràfols as their number one goalkeeper including four consecutive league titles from 2012 until 2015; in each of those years she conceded the fewest goals among the league's goalkeepers.

International
Ràfols was one of the goalkeepers for the Spain under-19 team that participated in 2008 UEFA Championship. She was also captain of the Catalonia's national team.

Education
She has a degree in sports physiotherapy and a master's degree in physical activity, health and training.

Honours

Club
 FC Barcelona
 Primera División (4): 2011–12, 2012–13, 2013–14, 2014–15
 Segunda División: 2007–08
 Copa de la Reina de Fútbol (4): 2011, 2013, 2014, 2017.
 Copa Catalunya (8): 2009, 2010, 2011, 2012, 2014, 2015, 2016, 2017

References

External links
 
 Profile at FC Barcelona
 

1990 births
Living people
Spanish women's footballers
Footballers from Catalonia
Primera División (women) players
FC Barcelona Femení players
Women's association football goalkeepers
People from Vilafranca del Penedès
Sportspeople from the Province of Barcelona
FC Barcelona Femení B players
Sportswomen from Catalonia